Sinoria is a genus of millipedes belonging to the family Xystodesmidae.

The species of this genus are found in China.

Species:
 Sinoria tianmu Tanabe, Ishii & Yin, 1996

References

Xystodesmidae